Lewis, Samuel, House can refer to:
 Samuel Lewis House (Bozeman, Montana), listed on the National Register of Historic Places (NRHP) in Montana
 Samuel Lewis House (Mansfield, Ohio), listed on the NRHP in Ohio
 Samuel Lewis Farmhouse, listed on the NRHP in Radnor, Ohio